Berbinzana  (Basque: Berbintzana) is a town and municipality located in the province and autonomous community of Navarre, in northern Spain.

Overview 

Berbinzana is a small village located in Navarre province, in Northern Spain.  (Navarre is best known for the town of Pamplona and its "Sanfermines").
Berbinzana is on the banks of the Arga River and surrounded by fertile fields.  Agriculture is the primary economic activity.  Berbinzana also has a wide variety of plants and animals.  Berbinzana has a deeply rooted culture and is faithful to its traditions, where the festivities are celebrated with the traditional red handkerchief.

Nature
Berbinzana has a fairly typical Mediterranean climate, with warm summers and cold winters. The Arga river tempers this some and provides many wild animals to the area.

Culture 
There are several groups that promote cultural activities. These include "San Isidro", with more than six hundred members, the young society of "La Unión", and the football club CD Injerto.

Events
A good time to enjoy visiting Berbinzana is during one of its numerous events. Here are some of the main holidays:
 Asunción Fiesta: From August 14 to 21. It is the patron saint day and the main event in the village.
 Angel Fiesta: March 1. It is a small fiesta and lasts 4 days.
 St Isidro: May 15. It is the farmer festivity and the recreational society.
 The Young Holiday: In the early days of December. It is organised by "La Unión"

The principal activities are the festivals, the running of the bulls, dances, fireworks and other spectacles.

Municipalities in Navarre